Choi Woong (born Choi Sun-woong; December 28, 1986) is a South Korean actor and model. He starred in television series such as Secret Love (2013), and Descendants of the Sun (2016).

Filmography

Film

Television series

Awards and nominations

References

External links

1986 births
Living people
South Korean male television actors
South Korean male film actors
People from Daegu